Morafenobe is a town and commune in western Madagascar. It belongs to the district of Morafenobe, which is a part of Melaky Region.

Morafenobe is served by a local airport. Primary and junior level secondary education are available in town. The town provides access to hospital services to its citizens.

Geography
This town is located at the Manambaho river between Maintirano and Beravina.

References and notes 

Populated places in Melaky